Micrecia is a genus of moths in the family Sesiidae.

Species
Micrecia methyalina Hampson, 1919
Micrecia capillaria Kallies, 2020
Micrecia hawkei Kallies, 2020
Micrecia kuukuyau Kallies, 2020

References

Sesiidae